Hampshire Rugby Football Union is the governing body for rugby union in the county of Hampshire, England.  It represent clubs sides not just from Hampshire but also from the Isle of Wight and the Channel Islands, who take part in many of the competitions organized by the Hampshire RFU.

History
At the initiative of the Trojans Rugby Club a meeting was held on 13 April 1883 to discuss the formation of "The Hampshire County Rugby Football Union". In this inaugural season at least seven Trojans represented the County. The United Services proved to be the other early mainstay of the county side. In 1901 County activities had ceased. Once again, the Trojans, along with United Services Portsmouth RFC convened a meeting in 1910 at the Trojans Club for the purpose of forming a Rugby Football Union in Hampshire. Since then, with a notably strong side in the 1930s (drawn largely from the United Services) the county has won the County Championship twice, featuring in four finals. Their last appearance in the County Championship final was in 1962 although they did play in the County Championship Plate final in 2008 at Aldershot, beating Leicestershire 22-12.

County side

Honours
The county side has been in the county championship cup final four times, winning the title on two occasions.  They have also played in the Plate(shield) -now named Bill Beaumont County Championship final three times, winning on two appearances. Division 3 winners twice, runner up Division 2 final.

Notable players for the County side
  Jonny Wilkinson
  Arthur Gould

Affiliated clubs
There are currently 44 clubs affiliated with the Hampshire RFU, most of which have teams at both senior and junior level.  The majority of clubs are in Hampshire but a number are based in the Isle of Wight or the Channel Islands as well as other counties such as Surrey.

Aldershot & Fleet
Alresford
Alton
Andover
Basingstoke
Bognor  
Bournemouth  
Camberley  
Chineham
Eastleigh
Ellingham & Ringwood
Fareham Heathens
Farnborough
Farnham 
Fawley
Fordingbridge
Gosport & Fareham
Guernsey 
Havant
Hook & Odiham
Isle of Wight 
Jersey Reds 
Jersey United Banks 
Kingsclere
Locksheath Pumas
Lymington Mariners
Millbrook
New Milton & District
Overton
Petersfield
Portsmouth
Romsey
Ryde
Sandown & Shanklin
Scottish Exiles
Southampton
Tadley
Tottonians
Trojans
U.S. Portsmouth
Vectis
Ventnor
Winchester

County club competitions 

The Hampshire RFU currently runs the following club competitions for club sides based in Hampshire, the Isle of Wight and the Channel Islands:

Leagues

Hampshire Premier - league at tier 9 of the English rugby union system
Hampshire 1 - league at tier 10
Hampshire 2 - league at tier 11

Cups
Hampshire Cup - for club sides that typically play between tiers 6-7 of the English rugby union league system
Hampshire Bowl - for clubs sides at tiers 8-9
Hampshire Plate - for club sides at tiers 9-11

Notes

See also
London & SE Division
English rugby union system

References

External links
Homepage
 Club Rugby

Rugby union governing bodies in England
Sports organizations established in 1883
Rugby union in Hampshire